Ihor Oleksandrovych Voronchenko (born 22 August 1964) is a Ukrainian Vice Admiral and a former commander of the Ukrainian Navy.

Before becoming commander of the Ukrainian Navy, Voronchenko held the staff position in General Staff, the position of chief of the Coastal Defense Administration (Ukrainian Navy), and was a commander of a former National Guard of Ukraine regiment that was later transformed into a battalion of Marine Infantry. Voronchenko served in Crimea starting in 1998.

Career 
Voronchenko was born 22 August 1964 in the village of Babai in Kharkiv Raion.

After graduation from the Tashkent Higher Tank Command School Voronchenko was assigned to East-Germany where he was commander of a tank platoon until 1988. Voronchenko then became a commander of a tank company in the Belarusian Military District. After the collapse of the Soviet Union he returned to Ukraine and continued service in the National Guard of Ukraine in Kharkiv. Then he graduated from the Academy of the Armed Forces of Ukraine. Starting in 1998, he served in Crimea on the post of commander of a National Guard regiment. And then became Crimea's chief of the Coastal Defense Administration of the Ukrainian Navy.

During the February/March 2014 Russian annexation of Crimea Voronchenko was captured and detained for 4 days in Crimea before being released on 27 March 2014.

Voronchenko was appointed acting commander of the Ukrainian Navy on 25 April 2016. And on 3 July 2016 President Petro Poroshenko appointed him as commander of the Ukrainian Navy. The same day Voronchenko was conferred the rank of Vice Admiral (on 25 April 2016 he held the rank of Lieutenant General). On 11 June 2020 President Volodymyr Zelensky appointed Oleksiy Neizhpapa as commander of the Ukrainian Navy.

References

Living people
1964 births
People from Kharkiv Oblast
Ukrainian admirals
Ukrainian generals
Naval commanders of Ukraine
Officers of the Ordre national du Mérite
Recipients of the Order of Danylo Halytsky